The Party of Democratic Socialism (KODISO; , Komma Dimokratikou Sosialismou) is a former centre-left political party in Greece founded in 1979 by former members of the Union of the Democratic Centre (EDIK). Its first president was Yagos Pesmazoglou. The KODISO was dissolved in 1989 into Synaspismos.

History
The party participated in the 1981 legislative election in a coalition with Peasants and Workers Party, in which it gained 0.7% of the vote. In the 1981 European Parliament election, it earned a seat for its president Yagos Pesmazoglou. The party was noted for its pro-European Union stance.

In the 1984 European Parliament election, the party won 0.8% of the vote and Pesmazoglou resigned. He was succeeded by Babis Protopapas. Shortly before the 1985 legislative election, the withdrawal of Sotiris Kouvelas and Virginia Tsouderou led the party to participate with New Democracy.

In 1986, the party chose a more leftist direction resulting in it becoming one of the parties which created the Coalition of the Left and Progress, also known as Synaspismos, in 1989.

See also
 Synaspismos

References

Social democratic parties in Greece
1979 establishments in Greece
Political parties established in 1979